The order of precedence in Scotland was fixed by Royal Warrant in 1905. Amendments were made by further Warrants in 1912, 1952, 1958, 1999 to coincide with the establishment of the Scottish Parliament and Scottish Government and most recently in 2012.

The relative precedence of peers of Scotland is determined by the Act of Union 1707.

Gentlemen

Royalty, high officials, et al.

Royal family

The King
The Lord High Commissioner to the General Assembly of the Church of Scotland (Lord Hodge)
The Duke of Rothesay
The Earl of Dumbarton
Prince George of Wales
Prince Louis of Wales
Prince Archie of Sussex
The Earl of Inverness
The Duke of Edinburgh
Peter Phillips
Earl of Forfar
The Lord Culloden
The Earl of St Andrews
Prince Michael of Kent
The Earl of Snowdon

High Officers of State, et al.

Nobility, et al.

Dukes, et al.

Marquesses, et al.

Earls, et al.

Judiciary, et al.
Lord Justice General (Lord Carloway)
Lord Clerk Register (The Lord Mackay of Clashfern)
Lord Advocate (Office held by a woman)
Advocate General for Scotland (The Lord Stewart of Dirleton)
Lord Justice Clerk (Lady Dorrian)

Viscounts
Eldest sons of earls
Lord Frederick Windsor
Younger sons of marquesses

Viscounts, et al.

Barons and Lords of Parliament
Eldest sons of viscounts
Younger sons of earls
Eldest sons of barons
Knights of the Garter
Knights of the Thistle
Privy Counsellors
Senators of the College of Justice and the Chairman of the Scottish Land Court
Younger sons of viscounts
Younger sons of barons
Sons of Law Life Peers
Baronets
Knights of St Patrick (none, order dormant)
Knights Grand Cross of the Order of the Bath
Knights Grand Commanders of the Order of the Star of India (none, order dormant)
Knights Grand Cross of the Order of St Michael and St George
Knights Grand Commander of the Order of the Indian Empire (none, order dormant)
Knights Grand Cross of the Royal Victorian Order
Knights Grand Cross of the Order of the British Empire
Knights Commanders of the Order of the Bath
Knights Commanders of the Order of the Star of India (none, order dormant)
Knights Commanders of the Order of St Michael and St George
Knights Commanders of the Order of the Indian Empire (none, order dormant)
Knights Commanders of the Royal Victorian Order
Knights Commanders of the Order of the British Empire
Solicitor General for Scotland (Ruth Charteris – see Order of Precedence for Ladies below)
Lyon King of Arms (Joseph Morrow)
Scottish Barons
Sheriffs-Principal
Knights Bachelor
Sheriffs as amended by
Companions of the Order of the Bath
Companions of the Order of the Star of India (none, order dormant)
Companions of the Order of St Michael and St George
Companions of the Order of the Indian Empire (none, order dormant)
Commanders of the Royal Victorian Order
Commanders of the Order of the British Empire
Lieutenants of the Royal Victorian Order
Companions of the Distinguished Service Order
Officers of the Order of the British Empire
Companions of the Imperial Service Order
Eldest sons of younger sons of peers
Eldest sons of baronets
Eldest sons of Knights of the Garter
Eldest sons of Knights of the Thistle
Eldest sons of Knights of St Patrick
Eldest sons of Knights Grand Cross of the Order of the Bath
Eldest sons of Knights Grand Commander of the Star of India
Eldest sons of Knights Grand Cross of the Order of St Michael and St George
Eldest sons of Knights Grand Commander of the Order of the Indian Empire
Eldest sons of Knights Grand Cross of the Royal Victorian Order
Eldest sons of Knights Grand Cross of the Order of the British Empire
Eldest sons of Knights Commander of the Order of the Bath
Eldest sons of Knights Commander of the Order of the Star of India
Eldest sons of Knights Commander of the Order of St Michael and St George
Eldest sons of Knights Commander of the Order of the Indian Empire
Eldest sons of Knights Commander of the Royal Victorian Order
Eldest sons of Knights Commander of the Order of the British Empire
Members of the Royal Victorian Order
Members of the Order of the British Empire
Younger sons of baronets
Younger sons of Knights of the Garter
Younger sons of Knights of the Thistle
Younger sons of Knights of St Patrick
Younger sons of Knights Grand Cross of the Order of the Bath
Younger sons of Knights Grand Commander of the Star of India
Younger sons of Knights Grand Cross of the Order of St Michael and St George
Younger sons of Knights Grand Commander of the Order of the Indian Empire
Younger sons of Knights Grand Cross of the Royal Victorian Order
Younger sons of Knights Grand Cross of the Order of the British Empire
Younger sons of Knights Commander of the Order of the Bath
Younger sons of Knights Commander of the Order of the Star of India
Younger sons of Knights Commander of the Order of St Michael and St George
Younger sons of Knights Commander of the Order of the Indian Empire
Younger sons of Knights Commander of the Royal Victorian Order
Younger sons of Knights Commander of the Order of the British Empire
King's Counsel as amended by
Esquires
Gentlemen

Ladies
Queen consort (Queen Camilla)
Queens dowager (none living; ordered according to husband's death, earliest first)
Wife of the Heir Apparent
Catherine, Duchess of Rothesay
Wives of the Sovereign's younger sons
Meghan, Countess of Dumbarton
Daughters of the Sovereign (None)
Wife of the Sovereign's eldest grandson in male line (None)
Other Granddaughters-in-law of the Sovereign (None)
Granddaughters of the Sovereign
Princess Charlotte of Wales, only daughter of the Duke of Rothesay
Princess Lilibet of Sussex, only daughter of the Earl of Dumbarton
Sisters-in-law of the Sovereign
Sophie, Duchess of Edinburgh
Sisters of the Sovereign
Anne, Princess Royal
Aunts (by marriage) of the Sovereign (none living)
Aunts (by blood) of the Sovereign (none living)
Nieces (by marriage) of the Sovereign (none living)
Nieces (by blood) of the Sovereign
Zara Tindall
Princess Beatrice
Princess Eugenie
Lady Louise Mountbatten-Windsor
Granddaughters-in-law of former Sovereigns (whose husbands are Dukes)
Birgitte, Lady Culloden
Katharine, Countess of St Andrews
Granddaughters-in-law of former Sovereigns (whose husbands are not Dukes)
Princess Michael of Kent
Cousins of the Sovereign
Lady Sarah Chatto
Lords Lieutenant (see list below)
Sheriff Principal (during term of office and with bounds of Sheriffdom)
Commonwealth Prime Ministers, while visiting the UK, in order of appointment
Ambassadors of foreign countries and High Commissioners of Commonwealth countries according to date of arrival
Duchesses
Claire Booth, wife of Earl of Ulster
Sylvana Tomaselli, wife of Earl of St Andrews
Lady Davina Windsor, elder daughter of the Duke of Gloucester
Lady Rose Gilman, younger daughter of the  Duke of Gloucester
Lady Helen Taylor, only daughter of the Duke of Kent
Marchionesses
Wives of dukes' eldest sons
Daughters of dukes not married to peers
Countesses
Wives of marquesses' eldest sons
Lady Gabriella Windsor
Princess Alexandra, The Hon Lady Ogilvy
Marquesses' daughters not married to peers
Wives of dukes' younger sons
Viscountesses
Wives of eldest sons of earls or of countesses in their own right
Earls' daughters not married to peers
Sophie Winkleman, wife of Lord Frederick Windsor
Wives of marquesses' younger sons
Baronesses, wives of Lords of Parliament and female holders of Lordships of Parliament
Wives of viscounts' eldest sons
Viscounts' daughters not married to peers
Wives of younger sons of earls or of countesses in their own right
Wives of eldest sons of barons or baronesses
Daughters of barons or baronesses
Ladies of the Garter
Eliza Manningham-Buller, Baroness Manningham-Buller
Lady Mary Fagan
Lady Mary Peters
Valerie Amos, Baroness Amos
Ladies of the Thistle
Lady Elish Angiolini
Wives of Knights of the Garter
all rank higher, except:
June Hillary
Jennifer Acland
Norma Major
Cherie Blair
Wives of Knights of the Thistle
all rank higher, except:
Poppy Anderson
Privy Counsellors
Senators of the College of Justice
Wives of viscounts' younger sons
Wives of younger sons of barons or baronesses
Wives of baronets
Dames Grand Cross of the Order of the Bath
Dames Grand Cross of the Order of St Michael and St George
Dames Grand Cross of the Royal Victorian Order
Dames Grand Cross of the Order of the British Empire
Wives of Knights Grand Cross of the Order of the Bath
Wives of Knights Grand Commander of the Order of the Star of India
Wives of Knights Grand Cross of the Order of St Michael and St George
Wives of Knights Grand Commander of the Order of the Indian Empire
Wives of Knights Grand Cross of the Royal Victorian Order
Wives of Knights Grand Cross of the Order of the British Empire
Dames Commander of the Order of the Bath
Dames Commander of the Order of St Michael and St George
Dames Commander of the Royal Victorian Order
Dames Commandes of the Order of the British Empire
Solicitor General for Scotland (Ruth Charteris)
Wives of Knights Commander of the Order of the Bath
Wives of Knights Commander of the Order of the Star of India
Wives of Knights Commander of the Order of St Michael and St George
Wives of Knights Commander of the Order of the Indian Empire
Wives of Knights Commander of the Royal Victorian Order
Wives of Knights Commander of the Order of the British Empire
Companions of the Order of the Bath
Companions of the Order of St Michael and St George
Commanders of the Royal Victorian Order
Commanders of the Order of the British Empire
Wives of Companions of the Order of the Bath
Wives of Companions of the Order of the Star of India
Wives of Companions of the Order of St Michael and St George
Wives of Companions of the Order of the Indian Empire
Wives of Commanders of the Royal Victorian Order
Wives of Commanders of the Order of the British Empire
Wives of Companions of the Distinguished Service Order
Lieutenants of the Royal Victorian Order
Officers of the Order of the British Empire
Wives of Lieutenants of the Royal Victorian Order
Wives of Officers of the Order of the British Empire
Wives of Senators of the College of Justice
Wives of Knights Bachelor
Companions of the Imperial Service Order
Wives of Companions of the Imperial Service Order
Wives of the eldest sons of sons of peers or peeresses
Daughters of sons of peers or peeresses
Wives of the eldest sons of baronets
Daughters of baronets
Wives of eldest sons of Knights of the Garter
Wives of eldest sons of Knights of the Thistle
Wives of eldest sons of Knights of St Patrick
Wives of eldest sons of Knights Grand Cross of the Order of the Bath
Wives of eldest sons of Knights Grand Commander of the Star of India
Wives of eldest sons of Knights Grand Cross of the Order of St Michael and St George
Wives of eldest sons of Knights Grand Commander of the Order of the Indian Empire
Wives of eldest sons of Knights Grand Cross of the Royal Victorian Order
Wives of eldest sons of Knights Grand Cross of the Order of the British Empire
Wives of eldest sons of Knights Commander of the Order of the Bath
Wives of eldest sons of Knights Commander of the Order of the Star of India
Wives of eldest sons of Knights Commander of the Order of St Michael and St George
Wives of eldest sons of Knights Commander of the Order of the Indian Empire
Wives of eldest sons of Knights Commander of the Royal Victorian Order
Wives of eldest sons of Knights Commander of the Order of the British Empire
Daughters of Knights of the Garter
Daughters of Knights of the Thistle
Daughters of Knights of St Patrick
Daughters of Knights Grand Cross of the Order of the Bath
Daughters of Knights Grand Commander of the Star of India
Daughters of Knights Grand Cross of the Order of St Michael and St George
Daughters of Knights Grand Commander of the Order of the Indian Empire
Daughters of Knights Grand Cross of the Royal Victorian Order
Daughters of Knights Grand Cross of the Order of the British Empire
Daughters of Knights Commander of the Order of the Bath
Daughters of Knights Commander of the Order of the Star of India
Daughters of Knights Commander of the Order of St Michael and St George
Daughters of Knights Commander of the Order of the Indian Empire
Daughters of Knights Commander of the Royal Victorian Order
Daughters of Knights Commander of the Order of the British Empire
Members of the Royal Victorian Order
Members of the Order of the British Empire
Wives of Members of the Royal Victorian Order
Wives of Members of the Order of the British Empire
Wives of younger sons of baronets
Wives of younger sons of Knights of the Garter
Wives of younger sons of Knights of the Thistle
Wives of younger sons of Knights of St Patrick
Wives of younger sons of Knights Grand Cross of the Order of the Bath
Wives of younger sons of Knights Grand Commander of the Star of India
Wives of younger sons of Knights Grand Cross of the Order of St Michael and St George
Wives of younger sons of Knights Grand Commander of the Order of the Indian Empire
Wives of younger sons of Knights Grand Cross of the Royal Victorian Order
Wives of younger sons of Knights Grand Cross of the Order of the British Empire
Wives of younger sons of Knights Commander of the Order of the Bath
Wives of younger sons of Knights Commander of the Order of the Star of India
Wives of younger sons of Knights Commander of the Order of St Michael and St George
Wives of younger sons of Knights Commander of the Order of the Indian Empire
Wives of younger sons of Knights Commander of the Royal Victorian Order

Local precedence
The Lord Lieutenant of the lieutenancy areas (the Lord Provost is Lord Lieutenant in the 4 largest cities):
The Lord Provost of Aberdeen (David Cameron)
Lord Lieutenant of Aberdeenshire (Sandy Manson)
Lord Lieutenant of Angus (Patricia Ann Sawers)
Lord Lieutenant of Argyll and Bute (Jane Margaret MacLeod  )
Lord Lieutenant of Ayrshire and Arran (Iona McDonald)
Lord Lieutenant of Banffshire (Andrew Simpson)
Lord Lieutenant of Berwickshire (Jeanna Swan)
Lord Lieutenant of Caithness (John Sinclair, 3rd Viscount Thurso)
Lord Lieutenant of Clackmannanshire (Johnny Stewart)
Lord Lieutenant of Dumfries (Fiona Armstrong)
Lord Lieutenant of Dunbartonshire (Jill Williamina Young)
The Lord Provost of Dundee (Bill Campbell)
Lord Lieutenant of East Lothian (Roderick Urquhart)
The Lord Provost of Edinburgh (Robert Aldridge)
Lord Lieutenant of Fife (Robert William Balfour)
The Lord Provost of Glasgow (Jacqueline McLaren)
Lord Lieutenant of Inverness (James Wotherspoon)
Lord Lieutenant of Kincardineshire (Carol Kinghorn)
Lord Lieutenant of Lanarkshire (Susan Haughey)
Lord Lieutenant of Midlothian (Richard Callander)
Lord Lieutenant of Moray (Seymour Monro)
Lord Lieutenant of Nairn (George Russell Asher)
Lord Lieutenant of Orkney (Elaine Grieve)
Lord Lieutenant of Perth and Kinross (Stephen Leckie)
Lord Lieutenant of Renfrewshire (Col. Peter McCarthy)
Lord Lieutenant of Ross and Cromarty (Joanie Whiteford)
Lord Lieutenant of Roxburgh, Ettrick and Lauderdale (Richard Scott, 10th Duke of Buccleuch)
Lord Lieutenant of Shetland (Bobby Hunter)
Lord Lieutenant of Stirling and Falkirk (Alan Simpson)
Lord Lieutenant of Sutherland (Major General Patrick Marriott)
Lord Lieutenant of The Stewartry of Kirkcudbright (Matthew Murray Kennedy St Clair, 18th Lord Sinclair)
Lord Lieutenant of Tweeddale (Hew Strachan)
Lord Lieutenant of the Western Isles (Iain Macaulay)
Lord Lieutenant of West Lothian (Moria Niven)
Lord Lieutenant of Wigtown (Aileen Brewis)
The Provost
The Deputy Provost
Justices of the Peace
The Chief Constable

Notes

References

External links
The Scale of General Precedence in Scotland

1905 establishments in Scotland
Scotland
Scottish monarchy
Scottish society
Politics of Scotland